East Nanango is a rural locality in the South Burnett Region, Queensland, Australia.

History 
Mount Stanley Road State School opened on 6 March 1925 and closed circa 1957. It was located on the north side of Mount Stanley Road (approx ).

References 

South Burnett Region
Localities in Queensland